Margot Eppinger (born 8 January 1952) is a German athlete. She competed in the women's pentathlon at the 1972 Summer Olympics and the 1976 Summer Olympics.

References

External links
 

1952 births
Living people
Athletes (track and field) at the 1972 Summer Olympics
Athletes (track and field) at the 1976 Summer Olympics
German pentathletes
Olympic athletes of West Germany
People from Esslingen (district)
Sportspeople from Stuttgart (region)